Love or Spend is a 2015 Taiwanese television series starring Kingone Wang, Jolin Chien,  and Li Jing Tian. Shooting began on October 23, 2015, and wrapped up on February 22, 2016. The original broadcast began on November 4, 2015, on SETTV, airing weekdays (Monday through Friday) at 8:00 pm.

Premise

Pei Zheng Xi (Kingone Wang) and Mo Cheng Zhen (Jennifer Hong) have been close friends since childhood. Their mothers are best friends and have always hoped that their kids would fall in love and marry each other, but the two share no romantic feelings. Ultimately, their mothers convince them to explore their individual love lives and find their soul mates by their 32nd birthdays. If they fail to find their matches, they have to marry each other.

Cast

Main cast
Kingone Wang as Pei Zheng Xi 裴正希
 as Mo Cheng Zhen 莫洆湞
Jolin Chien as Mo Cheng Han 莫丞翰
 as Pei You Ting 裴又婷
Li Jing Tian (李京恬) as Pei You Xin 裴又欣

Supporting cast
 as Xu Wei Ming 徐維銘（Victor）
 as He Li Yang 何立揚
Fu Lei (傅雷) as Pei Yong Jin 裴勇進
Tan Ai-chen as Chen Cai Ling 陳采靈
 as Huang Ji Xia 黃季霞
 as Xu Zhi Hui 徐志輝（Stanley）
Lin Xiu Jun (林秀君) as Gong Pei Rong 鞏佩蓉（Wendy）
 as Wu Ren Yan 吳仁彥
 as Lu Wei Xuan 陸蔚萱
 as Zheng Jia Zheng 鄭嘉政
Yang Chieh-mei as Chen Yu Hua 陳郁華
 as Hong Xing Yuan 洪行遠
Yan Yi Ping (顏怡平) as Yan Man Man 顏蔓蔓
 as Qian Xiao Wei 錢曉薇
Lin Jia Wei (林家磑) as Gao Yi Dian 高一點
Yang Li-yin as Xu Hua Hua 許花花
Zhang Yu Ci (張淯詞) as Feng Xia Sheng 馮夏生
Esther Huang as Hong Qian Hui 洪千慧 (Vivian)

Cameo
 as Bei Bei 蓓蓓
Joanne Tseng as Li Yi Wan 黎一彎
Melvin Sia as Du Xiao Fei 杜曉飛
Lin Zhi Hao (林志豪) as Ye Dong 葉董
 as child Zheng Xi

Soundtrack

Broadcast

Episode ratings

: No episode was aired on December 31, 2015 due to SETTV airing New Year's Eve countdown special show.

Awards and nominations

External links
Love or Spend SETTV Official website 
Love or Spend ETTV Website 
Love or Spend Official Facebook page

References

2015 Taiwanese television series debuts
2016 Taiwanese television series endings
Eastern Television original programming
Sanlih E-Television original programming
Taiwanese romance television series
Taiwanese LGBT-related television shows